The Ruhr is a large coal field located in the west of Germany in North Rhine-Westphalia. Ruhr represents one of the largest coal reserve in Germany having estimated reserves of 42 billion tonnes of coal.

See also 
List of coalfields
Rheinisches Braunkohlerevier

References 

Coal mining regions in Germany
Economy of North Rhine-Westphalia